Tina Shaw (born 1961) is a New Zealand author.

Shaw was born in 1961, in Auckland, New Zealand and grew up in Matangi and Christchurch.

Works 
Novels published by Shaw include:
 Birdie (1996)
 Dreams of America (1997)
 City of Reeds (2000)
 Paradise (2002)
 The Black Madonna (2005, Penguin)
 Brenda's Planetary Holiday (2006), children's novel
 Fluff Helps Out (Puffin, 2006), children's novel
 Into the Hinterland (2008, Pearson Education), children's novel
  Dogs of the Hinterland (2008, Pearson Education), children's novel
  Koevasi (2008, Pearson Education), children's novel
 About Griffen’s Heart (2009, Longacre), young adult novel
 The Children's Pond (2014, Pointer Press Ltd)
 Make a Hard Fist (2017, OneTree House)
 Ursa (2019, Walker Books), young adult novel
 Ephemera (2020, Cloud Ink Press)
She edited the travel writing collection, A Passion for Travel (1998) and with Jack Ross, the anthology Myths of the 21st Century (Reed, 2006).

Awards 
Shaw received the 1999 Grimshaw Sargeson Fellowship and the Creative New Zealand 2001 Berlin Writers Residency. She was the 2005 writer in residence at the University of Waikato.

In 2003, her story 'Coarse Fishing' was runner-up in the Sunday-Star Times Short Story Competition.

About Griffen’s Heart (2009) was listed as a 2010 Notable Young Adult Fiction Book by Storylines and was shortlisted in the 2010 LIANZA Children and Young Adult Book Awards.

The Children's Pond (2014) was shortlisted for the 2015 Ngaio Marsh Award for Best Crime Novel.

In 2018, Shaw won the Tessa Duder Award for her manuscript Ursa.

References

External links 
 Official website

Living people
1961 births
People from Auckland
New Zealand fiction writers
New Zealand women novelists
New Zealand women short story writers